Gascon is the name of the vernacular Romance variety spoken mainly in the region of Gascony, France. It is often considered a variety of Occitan, although some authors consider it a different language.

Gascon is mostly spoken in Gascony and Béarn (Béarnese dialect) in southwestern France (in parts of the following French départements: Pyrénées-Atlantiques, Hautes-Pyrénées, Landes, Gers, Gironde, Lot-et-Garonne, Haute-Garonne, and Ariège) and in the Val d'Aran of Catalonia.

Aranese, a southern Gascon variety, is spoken in Catalonia alongside Catalan and Spanish. Most people in the region are trilingual in all three languages, causing some influence from Spanish and Catalan. Both these influences tend to differentiate it more and more from the dialects of Gascon spoken in France. Most linguists now consider Aranese a distinct dialect of Occitan and Gascon. Since the 2006 adoption of the new statute of Catalonia, Aranese is co-official with Catalan and Spanish in all of Catalonia (before, this status was valid for the Aran Valley only).

It was also one of the mother tongues of the English kings Richard the Lionheart and his younger brother John Lackland.

Linguistic classification

The majority of scholars think that Occitan constitutes a single language.

Some authors reject this opinion and even the name Occitan, thinking that there is a family of distinct lengas d'òc rather than dialects of a single language. Gascon, in particular, is distinct enough linguistically to have been described as a language in its own right.

Basque substrate
The language spoken in Gascony before Roman rule was part of the Basque dialectal continuum (see Aquitanian language); the fact that the word 'Gascon' comes from the Latin root vasco/vasconem, which is the same root that gives us 'Basque', implies that the speakers identified themselves at some point as Basque. There is a proven Basque substrate in the development of Gascon. This explains some of the major differences that exist between Gascon and other Occitan dialects. 

A typically Gascon feature that may arise from this substrate is the change from "f" to "h". A similar change took place in Spanish. Thus, Latin facere gives Spanish hacer ([aˈθer]) (or, in some parts of southwestern Andalusia).

Although some linguists deny the plausibility of the Basque substrate theory, it is widely assumed that Basque, the "Circumpyrenean" language (as put by Basque linguist Alfonso Irigoyen and defended by Koldo Mitxelena, 1982), is the underlying language spreading around the Pyrenees onto the banks of the Garonne River, maybe as far east as the Mediterranean in Roman times (niska cited by Joan Coromines as the name of each nymph taking care of the Roman spa Arles de Tech in Roussillon, etc.). Basque gradually eroded across Gascony in the High Middle Ages (Basques from the Val d'Aran cited still circa 1000), with vulgar Latin and Basque interacting and mingling, but eventually with the former replacing the latter north of the east and middle Pyrenees and developing into Gascon.

However, modern Basque has had lexical influence from Gascon in words like beira ("glass"), which is also seen in Galician-Portuguese. One way for the introduction of Gascon influence into Basque came about through language contact in bordering areas of the Northern Basque Country, acting as adstrate. The other one takes place since the 11th century over the coastal fringe of Gipuzkoa extending from Hondarribia to San Sebastian, where Gascon was spoken up to the early 18th century and often used in formal documents until the 16th century, with evidence of its continued occurrence in Pasaia in the 1870s. A minor focus of influence was the Way of St James and the establishment of ethnic boroughs in several towns based on the privileges bestowed on the Francs by the Kingdom of Navarre from the 12th to the early 14th centuries, but the variant spoken and used in written records is mainly the Occitan of Toulouse.

The énonciatif (Occitan: enunciatiu) system of Gascon, a system that is more colloquial than characteristic of normative written Gascon and governs the use of certain preverbal particles (including the sometimes emphatic affirmative que, the occasionally mitigating or dubitative e, the exclamatory be, and the even more emphatic ja/ye, and the "polite" se) has also been attributed to the Basque substrate.

Gascon varieties 
Gascon is divided into three varieties or dialect sub-groups:
 Western Gascon, which includes Landese dialect and North-Gascon (bazadais, high-landese and bordelese)
 Eastern or interior Gascon, known as parlar clar (Béarnese)
 Pyrenean or southern Gascon, which includes Aranese dialect

The Jews of Gascony, who resided in Bordeaux, Bayonne and other cities, spoke until the beginning of the 20th century a sociolect of Gascon with special phonetic and lexical features, which linguistics named Judeo-Gascon. It has been superseded by a sociolect of French that retains most of the lexical features of this former variety.

Béarnais, the official language when Béarn was an independent state, does not correspond to a unified language: the three forms of Gascon are spoken in Béarn (in the south, Pyrenean Gascon, in the center and in the east, Eastern Gascon; to the north-west, Western Gascon).

Usage of the language

A poll conducted in Béarn in 1982 indicated that 51% of the population could speak Gascon, 70% understood it, and 85% expressed a favourable opinion regarding the protection of the language. However, use of the language has declined dramatically over recent years as a result of the Francization taking place during the last centuries, as Gascon is rarely transmitted to young generations any longer (outside of schools, such as the Calandretas).

By April 2011, the Endangered Languages Project estimated that there were only 250,000 native speakers of the language.  

The usual term for Gascon is "patois", a word designating in France a non-official and usually devaluated dialect (such as Gallo) or language (such as Occitan), regardless of the concerned region. It is mainly in Béarn that the population uses concurrently the term "Béarnais" to designate its Gascon forms. This is because of the political past of Béarn, which was independent and then part of a sovereign state (the shrinking Kingdom of Navarre) from 1347 to 1620.

In fact, there is no unified Béarnais dialect, as the language differs considerably throughout the province. Many of the differences in pronunciation can be divided into east, west, and south (the mountainous regions). For example, an 'a' at the end of words is pronounced "ah" in the west, "o" in the east, and "œ" in the south. Because of Béarn's specific political past, Béarnais has been distinguished from Gascon since the 16th century, not for linguistic reasons.

Influences on other languages 

Probably as a consequence of the linguistic continuum of occidental Romania and the French influence
over the Hispanic Mark on medieval times, shared similar and singular features are noticeable between Gascon and other Latin languages on the other side of the frontier: Aragonese and ultraoccidental Catalan (Catalan of La Franja).
Gascon is also (with Spanish, Navarro-Aragonese and French) one of the Romance influences in the Basque language.

Examples

See also
 Occitan conjugation
 Languages of France
 Béarnese dialect
 Landese dialect
 Vergonha
 Aragonese language

Notes and references

Notes

References

External links

Museum of local culture
 Teaching of Occitan and Basque in Aquitania 
 Cap'òc : Unitat d'Animacion Pedagogica en Occitan 
 Gascon Lanas (Institut d'Estudis Occitans)
 Per Noste Per Noste edicions
 IBG site opposing Gascon and Béarnais to Occitan
 IRC chat room devoted to the Gascon language
 A Vòste, Gascon language journal
 Lo gascon lèu e plan ("Gascon quick and well"), an instruction set for learning the language (in French)

 
Gascony